The Oponskoye Kingdom (supposed to mean "Yaponskoye tsarstvo", or "kingdom of Japan"), or as some English sources erroneously put it, Kingdom of Opona, is a mythical kingdom in Russian folklore, envisioned by Russian peasants as lying at the edge of the flat earth. Here, it was believed, the peasants lived happy lives undisturbed by the state or the gentry, under a "White Tsar" who ruled truly and justly. Such paradise places were also known under the names of the Golden Land, Land of Chud, and Belovodye.

The myth of the Utopian kingdom of old Russia is similar to other myths of "earthly paradises", out of sight but possibly reachable by the right courageous explorer, such as Shambhala, El Dorado, etc.

Initially the tale of Belovodye was treated as a hearsay about a real place. Groups of peasants from various regions of Russia were known to have gone on expeditions in the far north of Russia to find the mythical utopia. There was strain of old Believers called "Wanderers", since they spent their lives wandering, and some researchers asserted that they were instrumental in the propagation of the legend. However other researchers have arguments against this hypothesis. At the break of the 19th and 20th centuries  the tale gradually transformed from a "real thing" to an element of Russian folklore.

See also
Buyan island
Hyperborea
Iriy
Kitezh city
Cockaigne

References

Bibliography

 

Locations in Slavic mythology
Mythological kingdoms, empires, and countries
Russian folklore
Mythical utopias